HD 126614 is a trinary star system in the equatorial constellation of Virgo. The primary member, designated component A, is host to an exoplanetary companion. With an apparent visual magnitude of 8.81, it is too faint to be seen with the naked eye. The system is located at a distance of 239 light years from the Sun based on parallax measurements, but is drifting closer with a radial velocity of −33 km/s.

The primary is a late G-type star with a stellar classification of G8IV. It is a super metal-rich star; among the most metal-rich stars currently known. This is most likely an evolving subgiant star, but the very high metallicity makes comparisons to standard spectral types difficult.

The outer companion, designated LP 680-57, was first reported in 1960 with the W. J. Luyten proper motion catalog. The common proper motion of the system has been confirmed, indicating that they are gravitationally bound. Many multiple star catalogues still refer to this companion as component B, as it was known prior to the discovery of the closer companion.

A Doppler search for giant planets begun in 1997 at the Keck Observatory provided an 11 year baseline for detecting periodicity in the primary star's radial velocity data. In 2022, the inclination and true mass of HD 126614 Ab were measured via astrometry.

See also
 HD 34445
 HD 24496
 HD 13931
 Gliese 179
 QS Virginis
 List of extrasolar planets

References

G-type subgiants
M-type main-sequence stars
Triple stars
Planetary systems with one confirmed planet

Virgo (constellation)
BD-04 3690
126614
070623